Ragan is a surname. Notable people with the surname include:

Chuck Ragan, musician
Dave Ragan, professional golfer
David Ragan (born 1985), American stock car racer
Emily Lee Sherwood Ragan (1839–1916), American author, journalist
Ken Ragan, stock car racer and father of David
Mike Ragan, American actor
Sam Ragan, journalist, author, poet